La Masica is a town, with a population of 5,975 (2013 census), and a municipality in the Honduran department of Atlántida. The largest town of the municipality is San Juan Pueblo, with a population of 8,983 (2013 census).

References

External links
MUNICIPIO DE LA MASICA - SECRETARÍA DE GOBERNACIÓN Y JUSTICIA 
 

Municipalities of the Atlántida Department